Hildenbrand is a surname. Notable people with the surname include:

 Dave Hildenbrand (born 1973), Assistant minority leader of the Michigan Senate
 Hans Hildenbrand (1870–1957), German photographer from World War I
 Klaus-Peter Hildenbrand (born 1952), West German athlete
 Werner Hildenbrand (born 1936), German economist and mathematician
 Franz Xaver von Hildenbrand (1789–1849), Austrian physician and botanist

See also
 Hildebrand (disambiguation)